Norwich City Women is the women's football club affiliated to Norwich City F.C. Previously operated by a board of volunteers, Norwich City FC formally integrated the women's side into the club in February 2022. 

Norwich City appointed former footballer Flo Allen (footballer) as general manager of the women's side in June 2022.

Shaun Howes is the current manager, having been appointed to that post in May 2020. Norwich City Women compete in the FA Women's National League South East Division One, in the fourth tier of English women's football. According to Norwich City, "they are the official women's team of Norwich City Football Club". Norwich City Women play their home games at The Nest.
Norwich City Women are the current 2021 Norfolk County Cup Champions.

Players

First-team squad

Honours 
 Women's FA Cup
 Winners (1): 1985–86

References

Women's football clubs in England
Norwich City F.C.
FA Women's National League teams